Ruf Beats is an independent British independent record label. It was founded in Manchester, England, in 1993 by Dave Davis of Jeep Beat Collective.

History
Originally started in 1993 The Ruf Label, now known as Ruf Beats Music, was a primarily an output source for Dave Davies (a.k.a. THE RUF or dave the ruf) projects and alias. JEEP BEAT COLLECIVE became known worldwide for championing scratching, heavy bass and killer ruf beats and had releases on ruf beats, ninja tune, US bomb, andy smith's document, justin robertson's journeys CD and many more. MINDBOMB was Ruf's British hip hop vocal group that helped establish credibility for rhyming in homegrown voices and mixed humour and politics over some smoking hot music. GODFATHER OF WEIRD is Ruf's strange soundtrack project. The Ruf Diamonds series and Thermonuclear Soundwars were albums to showcase the cream of hip hop from all over the UK     Ruf Beats had over 25 releases up until 2003. Dave The Ruf is making new music for future release, and continues to DJ in his home-town of Manchester and around the world.

Artists
Jeep Beat Collective
MindBomb
Godfather of Weird
K Delight
Asti

Also compilation releases featuring:

Hearts of darkness,
Suspekt,
Metaphorce,
Unanimous,
Numskullz,
Krispy,
Icepick and DJ Supreme

Compilations
Ruf Diamonds Volume One (1996)
Jeep Beat Collective - Repossessed Wildstyles - Classic Cuts (1998)
Ruf Diamonds Volume 2 (1998)
Thermo Nuclear Soundwarz (2000)

References

External links
Ruf Beats Official Site
Ruf Mouth
The Ruf Label Discogs
Artist Page allmusic.com

British independent record labels
British hip hop record labels